Saiyan Tore Karan is a Bhojpuri film released in 1981  directed by Radhakant. Bhojpuri is a language of north-central and eastern India.

See also
Bhojpuri Film Industry
List of Bhojpuri films

References

External links

1981 films
1980s Bhojpuri-language films